Kill This Love is the second Korean-language extended play (third overall) by South Korean girl group Blackpink, released on April 5, 2019, by YG Entertainment and distributed through YG Plus and Interscope Records. It is their first Korean material since the release of Square Up in June 2018, and their debut release with Interscope Records. The title track was released as the lead single. The single peaked at number two in South Korea and became the group's first top-50 hit in the United States and the United Kingdom. The song "Don't Know What To Do" was later promoted in Korean music programs as the EP's sub-title track.

Kill This Love debuted at number 24 on the US Billboard 200 with 19,200 units including over 9,100 pure sales moved, becoming the highest-charting album by a female K-pop group at the time. The EP reached the top ten in many territories, including Canada, Japan, New Zealand and South Korea, and the top twenty in Australia. It was certified Platinum by the Korea Music Content Association (KMCA) in June 2019 for selling 250,000 units, becoming Blackpink's second EP to do so after Square Up, and was later certified 2× Platinum in September 2021 for selling 500,000 units.

Background and release
Yang Hyun-suk, founder of YG, announced on February 8, 2019, that Blackpink was set for a new release with an EP in March. The single and EP were announced on March 25. Between March 31 and April 1, multiple individual teaser pictures were posted onto their social media accounts. On July 26, it was announced that the group would release a Japanese version album of their EP Kill This Love through Interscope Records on September 11, 2019. The album missed its initial release date and was released on October 16, 2019. A live recording of the Japanese version of "Kill This Love", recorded in the Tokyo Dome on December 4, 2019, was included in the group's third live album Blackpink 2019-2020 World Tour In Your Area – Tokyo Dome, released on May 6, 2020, through Universal Music Japan.

Music and lyrics
The opening track, "Kill This Love" is a stomping, brassy electropop track with trap elements. The song contains "blaring horns and martial percussion", with Rosé and Jisoo leading the "impassioned" pre-choruses about breaking up. The second track, "Don't Know What To Do" is an EDM and pop song with throbbing bass, whistle-like hook and an acoustic guitar. "Kick It", the third song, is a song with elements of Southern trap, synth bass and acoustic guitar. The song is about telling past lovers: “I’m okay being alone / Don’t feel bad for me / I’m going to forget you now. The fourth track, "Hope Not", is a soft, acoustic pop-rock balladry about break-up where the person has moved on from yearning to acceptance. The closing track, "Ddu-Du Ddu-Du (remix)" was described as a "quivering, womping club-ready Remix".

Singles
"Kill This Love" was released on April 4, 2019, as the lead single from the extended play. An accompanying music video for the song was directed by Seo Hyun-seung and uploaded onto Blackpink's YouTube channel simultaneously with the single's release. Upon release, the music video broke the record for the most views within 24 hours, accumulating 56.7 million views. Furthermore, it became the fastest video to reach 100 million views on YouTube, doing so in approximately 2 days and 14 hours, beating the record set by fellow Korean artist Psy with "Gentleman" in 2013. Commercially, the single reached the charts in 27 countries. It peaked at number two in South Korea and became the group's first top-50 hit in the United States and the United Kingdom, thus also becoming the highest-charting female K-pop song on the Billboard Hot 100 at the time.

Critical reception

Kill This Love was met with generally favorable reviews from critics. At Metacritic, which assigns a normalized rating out of 100 to reviews from mainstream publications, the album received a weighted average score of 69 based on 4 reviews, indicating "generally favorable reviews". Laura Dzubay of Consequence of Sound said that the album "functions as a crisper, tighter, and even more badass lunge into the same ideas as last year’s album". She also noted the "balanced production styles, combined with the singers’ talents for vocal elasticity."

For Rolling Stone, Jeff Benjamin wrote that "There will be time for Blackpink to experiment—ideally in a full-length project. Until then, the women are deepening their brand of K-pop for a quickly growing, language-agnostic fanbase eagerly anticipating every fierce new beat drop." Michelle Kim from Pitchfork gave a mixed review, calling the album's production "weirdly dated, like it was crafted earlier in the decade and then forgotten in a time capsule for five years." Rhian Daly of NME said that the album "showcases a band who are certainly talented but perhaps not quite ready for the next upward arc in the ride they’re currently on."

Awards and nominations

Track listing

Charts

Weekly charts

Monthly charts

Year-end charts

Certifications 

|}

Release history

See also
 List of K-pop albums on the Billboard charts
 List of certified albums in South Korea

References

2019 EPs
Blackpink EPs
Korean-language EPs
YG Entertainment EPs
Interscope Records EPs